After losing star halfback Ray Rice to the NFL Draft, Rutgers faced a rebuilding season. Senior Mike Teel was forced to step up his game at quarterback without being able to rely on Rice so frequently. Rutgers started off very slowly, dropping 5 of the first 6 games, including two to Big East rivals West Virginia and Cincinnati. With dreams of a Big East championship now completely eroded, Rutgers now had to recover to try to at least secure a fourth consecutive bowl berth. Starting with a 12-10 win against Connecticut on homecoming weekend, Rutgers never lost another game. The next week, they posted an impressive 54-34 win over #17 Pittsburgh. They won their next four games, finishing the season 7-5 with a solid 5-2 conference record. Rutgers earned a bowl berth in the PapaJohns.com Bowl, and they won a close game against NC State for their third consecutive bowl win.

Schedule

References

Rutgers
Rutgers Scarlet Knights football seasons
Birmingham Bowl champion seasons
Rutgers Scarlet Knights football